Bosea yervamora Is a shrub up to 3 m with greenish slender branches. Leaves up to 7 cm long, ovate, lanceolate, alternate, short stalked, without hair. Flowers short terminal, arising from the axil of the leaf, indefinite inflorescences, greenish with two membranous, dry modified leaves at the base of the stem. Fruits greenish black turning pink when ripe, about the size of a small pea.

Distribution
In Tenerife it is locally common particularly along the north coast, Barranco Honda Santa Ursula, La Rambla, and Los Silos. In Gran Canaria it is found in the northern part of the island, Tafira, Moya, Agaete, Bandama etc. In La Palma it is distributed in the west coast region, Tazacorte and Santa Cruz. In La Gomera in Barranco dela Villa and Agulo, Vallehermoso, on dry slopes in the lower zone.

Gallery

References

External links
 https://powo.science.kew.org/taxon/urn:lsid:ipni.org:names:59770-1
 https://onlinelibrary.wiley.com/doi/10.1002/tax.12512
 https://www.gbif.org/occurrence/gallery?taxon_key=5548250
 https://www.floracanaria.com/especies/amaranthaceae/Bosea_yervamora.html
 https://www.researchgate.net/publication/279384062_On_some_constituents_of_Bosea_yervamora_fruits

Amaranthaceae
Endemic flora of the Canary Islands
Flora of the Canary Islands
Endemic flora of Macaronesia